An Foras Pátrúnachta na Scoileanna Lán-Ghaeilge Teo. is the largest patron body of gaelscoileanna in the Republic of Ireland. It was founded in 1993 to act as an alternative patron body for gaelscoileanna. The organisation's name is usually abbreviated to An Foras Pátrúnachta. 70 gaelscoileanna, which constitutes as of September 2017 44% of all the gaelscoileanna in the Republic of Ireland, are under the patronage of An Foras. In late 2017 they announced that from September 2018 school students under their patronage in schools would learn a third language alongside Irish and English in both primary and second-level and be taught one subject through that language. Their Ard-Rúnaí (Secretary General) is Caoimhín Ó hEaghra. He is a brother of national Irish journalists Cormac Ó hEaghra and Róisín O'Hara.

See also
 Gaelscoil
 Gaelcholáiste
 Gaeloideachas
 An Chomhairle um Oideachas Gaeltachta & Gaelscolaíochta
 Department of Education and Skills (Ireland)

References

Irish-language education
Irish words and phrases
Organizations established in 1993
1993 establishments in Ireland